Upper Barden Reservoir is an upland fresh water reservoir, one of two reservoirs that collect water from Barden Moor, and dam Barden Beck, a tributary of the River Wharfe in the Yorkshire Dales, North Yorkshire, England. The reservoir was opened in 1882 and also supplies fresh water to the Nidd Aqueduct, which transports it to Bradford. Upper Barden Reservoir was the second of the reservoirs to be built, (Lower Barden opened in 1860).

History 
Upper Barden Reservoir was constructed between 1876 and 1882. It is fed from streams running off Barden Moor, and its major outfall is Barden Beck, which feeds Lower Barden Reservoir and the River Wharfe. Separately, some of the outflow from Upper Barden runs into an aqueduct which in turns, feeds into the Nidd Aqueduct, supplying water to the Chellow Heights water treatment works (WTW) in Bradford. All of these works were undertaken by Bradford Corporation Water Works, to improve the water supply into the town (later city) of Bradford, which did not have a major water supply nearby.

When Lower Barden reservoir was opened in 1860, it was noted that the valley above would also be ideally suited for a second reservoir with the capability of holding the same volume of water as the lower reservoir. Much of the Yorkshire Dales lies on limestone, but the area of Barden Moor is underlain by millstone grit, which is not as porous as limestone, so is ideal for reservoirs.

The scheme received royal assent in 1875, however, the necessary surveying and preparatory work took some time, with the design and construction down to the newly appointed (1875) Bradford Corporation Waterworks engineer, Alexander Binnie. Work started on the reservoir in 1876, with an estimated cost of £200,000. It was intended to hold  of water and, in the original plans, the lower reservoir was simply referred to as Barden Reservoir (or dam).

The Dam's cut-off (the lowest part of the wall designed to prevent seepage) was constructed from concrete, one of the first to be made from this material in England. The cut-off trench was dug and completed by May 1879, and because of the "exceptional use of concrete.." (at that time), the event attracted much attention, especially in engineering circles. At the time of its construction, the dam head embankment was the highest in England.

Upper Barden was first flooded in September 1882, and it reached its peak in December of the same year. However, formal opening of the dam was not until 29 May 1883, when a deputation from Bradford Corporation travelled to the site.

The area was subject to flash flooding in June 1908, when  of rain fell in 150 minutes. The dam walls, conduits and cut-offs, held up well, however the deluge destroyed many bridges and damaged roads in Airedale and Wharfedale.

The catchment area surrounding the reservoir is part of the West Nidderdale, Barden and Blubberhouses Moors SSSI. Like other reservoirs in the Yorkshire uplands, the water in Barden suffers from discolouration due to the peat run-off from the moors. The area around the two reservoirs is popular with walkers as the site is located in the Yorkshire Dales.

Upper Barden Reservoir is noted for its colony of black-headed gulls; one of the largest inland colonies in the north of England.

Reservoir railway 

As with other projects of this size, men and materials were transported to the site by a standard gauge  railway. Unusually, the railway had a transhipment point from a road; other major projects to create reservoirs in the Yorkshire Dales had railways connecting with heavy rail transhipment yards ( for Leighton and Roundhill, and the Nidd Valley Light Railway for those in Nidderdale).

On an average week,  of cement was shipped along the hillside to the dam head by the railway.

The railway was worked by three 0-6-0 saddle tank locomotives (named Bruce, Jingo and Wallace), made by the Hunslet Engine Company in Leeds. These were offered for sale in April 1883 at  railway station, after the work at the reservoir site was completed.

Notes

References

Citations

Sources

External links 

West Nidderdale, Barden and Blubberhouses Moors PDF

Reservoirs in North Yorkshire
Craven District
Drinking water reservoirs in England